Empire Chaucer was a  cargo ship which was built in 1942 by William Pickersgill & Sons Ltd, Sunderland. She was built for the Ministry of War Transport (MoWT).

Description
The ship was built by William Pickersgill & Sons Ltd, Sunderland. She was launched on 18 March 1942 and completed in May 1942.

She had a GRT of 5,970 and a NRT of 3,501.

History
Empire Chaucer was built for the MoWT. She was placed under the management of W J Tatem Ltd, Cardiff. Her port of registry was Sunderland. The Code Letters BDVX and United Kingdom Official Number 169018 were allocated.

In October 1942, Empire Chaucer departed Calcutta, India bound for the United Kingdom via Durban and Cape Town, South Africa and then via Trinidad. She was carrying a cargo of 2,000 tons of pig iron and 6,500 tons of general cargo, including mail and tea.

Empire Chaucer departed Durban on 13 October bound for Cape Town. The remaining 46 crew and a passenger took to the lifeboats. They were landed at Cape Town. The remaining 20 survivors landed at Bredasdorp on 31 October. Those lost on Empire Chaucer are commemorated at the Tower Hill Memorial, London.

References

1942 ships
Ships built on the River Wear
Empire ships
Ministry of War Transport ships
Steamships of the United Kingdom
Maritime incidents in October 1942
Ships sunk by German submarines in World War II
World War II shipwrecks in the Indian Ocean